Jim D. Underwood is a professor of management at Dallas Baptist University and the author of numerous books about business, including the best-selling More Than a Pink Cadillac: Mary Kay Inc.'s Nine Leadership Keys to Success (2003) about Mary Kay Ash.

Education
 B.B.A., Texas Wesleyan University
 M.B.A., University of Dallas
 M.A., Dallas Theological Seminary
 D.B.A., United States International University

Works
 The Significance Breakthrough, 2011
 Character and Success, 2011
 The Ethics Trap, 2011
 The Invisible Wall, 2010
 More Than A Pink Cadillac, 2004
 What's Your Corporate IQ?, 2004
 Competitor Intelligence, 2002
 Complexity and Paradox, 2002
 The New Corporate Strategy, 2002
 Thriving in E-Chaos, 2002
 The Significance Principle, 1998

External links
 press release about Underwood
 Faculty in the College of Business

Year of birth missing (living people)
Living people
People from Dallas
Writers from Texas
Texas Wesleyan University alumni
Dallas Theological Seminary alumni
University of Dallas alumni
Christian writers
United States International University alumni